The 1838 Mormon War, also known as the Missouri Mormon War, was a conflict between Mormons and non-Mormons in Missouri from August to November 1838, the first of the three "Mormon Wars".

Members of the Latter Day Saint movement, founded by Joseph Smith, had gradually migrated from New York to northwestern Missouri since 1831, mainly settling in Jackson County, where tensions with non-Mormon residents led to episodes of anti-Mormon violence. The Mormons were evicted from Jackson County in 1833 and resettled in new counties nearby, where tensions grew again and attempts to evict them resumed. On August 6, 1838, the war began following a brawl at an election in Gallatin, resulting in increased organized violence between Mormons and non-Mormons backed by the Missouri Volunteer Militia in northwestern Missouri. The Battle of Crooked River in late October led to Lilburn Boggs, the Governor of Missouri, issuing the Missouri Executive Order 44, ordering the Mormons to leave Missouri or be killed. On November 1, 1838, Smith surrendered at Far West, the church's headquarters, ending the war. Smith was charged for treason but escaped custody and fled to Illinois with the remainder of the estimated 10,000 Missouri Mormons, establishing the new settlement of Nauvoo.

During the conflict, 22 people were killed (three Mormons and one non-Mormon at Battle of Crooked Creek, one Mormon prisoner fatally injured while in custody, and 17 Mormons at Haun’s Mill), and an unknown number of non-combatants died due to exposure and hardship as a result of being expelled from their homes in Missouri. All of the conflicts in the Mormon War occurred in a corridor  to the east and northeast of Kansas City.

Background

Shortly after what Mormons consider to be the restoration of the gospel in 1830, Smith stated that he had received a revelation that the Second Coming of Christ was near, that the City of Zion would be near the town of Independence in Jackson County, Missouri, and that his followers were destined to inherit the land held by the current settlers.

If ye are faithful, ye shall assemble yourselves together to rejoice upon the land of Missouri, which is the land of your inheritance, which is now the land of your enemies.

Smith's followers, commonly known as Mormons, began to settle in Jackson County in 1831 to "build up" the city of Zion. Tensions built up between the rapidly growing Mormon community and the earlier settlers for a number of reasons:
The Mormons believed—after a revelation recorded on June 6, 1831—that if they were righteous they would inherit the land held by others ("which is now the land of your enemies") in Missouri.
Their economic cohesion allowed the Mormons to dominate local economies.
They believed that the Native Americans were descendants of Israelites and proselytized among them extensively.
Most Mormon immigrants to Missouri (which was at the time a slave state) came from areas which were sympathetic to abolitionism.

These tensions led to harassment and mob violence against the Mormon settlers. In October 1833, anti-Mormon mobs drove the Mormons from Jackson County.

At that time, opponents of the Mormons used a pattern that would be repeated four times, culminating in the expulsion of the Mormons from the entire state.  Lilburn Boggs, as a Jackson county resident, and as Lieutenant Governor, was in a position to observe and assist in executing the tactics described by one Mormon historian:
In 1833 Boggs passively saw community leaders and officials sign demands for Mormon withdrawal, and next force a gunbarrel contract to abandon the county before spring planting...anti-Mormon goals were reached in a few simple stages. Executive paralysis permitted terrorism, which forced Mormons to self-defense, which was immediately labeled as an "insurrection", and was put down by the activated militia of the county. Once Latter-day Saints were disarmed, mounted squads visited Mormon settlements with threats and enough beatings and destruction of homes to force flight.

Forcefully deprived of their homes and property, the Latter-day Saints temporarily settled in the area around Jackson County, especially in Clay County.

Mormon petitions and lawsuits failed to bring any satisfaction:  the non-Mormons in Jackson refused to allow the Mormons to return and reimbursement for confiscated and damaged property was refused.  In 1834, Mormons attempted to effect a return to Jackson County with a quasi-military expedition known as Zion's Camp, but this effort also failed when the governor failed to provide the expected support.

New converts to Mormonism continued to relocate to Missouri and settle in Clay County.  Tensions rose in Clay County as the Mormon population grew.  In an effort to keep the peace, Alexander William Doniphan of Clay County pushed a law through the Missouri legislature that created Caldwell County, Missouri, specifically for Mormon settlement in 1836.  Mormons had already begun buying land in the proposed Caldwell County, including areas that were carved off to become parts of Ray and Daviess Counties.  They had also founded the Caldwell County town of Far West as their Missouri headquarters.

Once they were established in a county of their own, a period of relative peace ensued.  According to an article in the Elders' Journal – a Latter Day Saint newspaper published in Far West – "The Saints here are at perfect peace with all the surrounding inhabitants, and persecution is not so much as once named among them..."

John Corrill, one of the Mormon leaders, remembered:
Friendship began to be restored between (the Mormons) and their neighbors, the old prejudices were fast dying away, and they were doing well, until the summer of 1838

Compromise breaks down, 1838

In 1837, problems at the church's headquarters in Kirtland, Ohio, centering on the Kirtland Safety Society bank, led to schism.  The church relocated from Kirtland to Far West, which became its new headquarters.  Mormon settlement increased as hundreds of members from Kirtland and elsewhere poured into Missouri.  Mormons established new colonies outside of Caldwell County, including Adam-ondi-Ahman in Daviess County and De Witt in Carroll County.

In the eyes of many non-Mormon citizens (including Alexander Doniphan), these settlements outside of Caldwell County were a violation of the compromise.  Mormons felt that the compromise only excluded major settlements in Clay County and Ray County, not Daviess County and Carroll County.

The earlier settlers saw expansion of Mormon communities outside of Caldwell County as a political and economic threat.  In Daviess County, where Whigs and Democrats had been roughly evenly balanced, Mormon population reached a level where they could determine election results.

Salt Sermon and Danites

At the same time, a leadership struggle between the church presidency and Missouri leaders led to the excommunication of several high-placed Mormon leaders, including Oliver Cowdery (one of the Three Witnesses and the church's original "second elder"), David Whitmer (another of the Three Witnesses and Stake President of the Missouri Church), as well as John Whitmer, Hiram Page, William Wines Phelps and others.I These "dissenters", as they came to be called, owned a significant amount of land in Caldwell County, much of which was purchased when they were acting as agents for the church. Possession became unclear and the dissenters threatened the church with lawsuits.

The presidency responded by urging the dissenters to leave the county, using strong words that the dissenters interpreted as threats.  In his famous Salt Sermon, Sidney Rigdon announced that the dissenters were as salt that had lost its savor and that it was the duty of the faithful to cast the dissenters out to be trodden beneath the feet of men.

At the same time Mormons, including Sampson Avard, began to organize a secret society known as the Danites, whose purposes included obeying the church presidency "right or wrong" and expelling the dissenters from Caldwell County.  Two days after Rigdon preached his Salt Sermon, 80 prominent Mormons, including Hyrum Smith, signed the so-called Danite Manifesto, which warned the dissenters to "depart or a more fatal calamity shall befall you".  On June 19, the dissenters and their families fled to neighboring counties where their complaints fanned anti-Mormon sentiment.

On July 4, Rigdon gave an oration, which was characterized by Mormon historian Brigham Henry Roberts as a Declaration of Independence' from all mobs and persecutions".  The text of this speech was endorsed by Joseph Smith, who appeared at the event and participated in the raising of a liberty pole.

In the speech, Rigdon declared that the Latter-day Saints would no longer be driven from their homes by persecution from without or dissension from within, and that if enemies came again to drive out the Saints, "And that mob that comes on us to disturb us, it shall be between us and them a war of extermination; for we will follow them until the last drop of their blood is spilled; or else they will have to exterminate us, for we will carry the seat of war to their own houses and their own families, and one party or the other shall be utterly destroyed".

The Election Day Battle at Gallatin

The "Election Day Battle at Gallatin" was a skirmish between Mormon and non-Mormon settlers in the newly formed Daviess County, Missouri, on August 6, 1838.

William Peniston, a candidate for the state legislature, made disparaging statements about the Mormons, calling them "horse-thieves and robbers", and warned them not to vote in the election.  Reminding Daviess County residents of the growing electoral power of the Mormon community, Peniston made a speech in Gallatin claiming that if the Missourians "suffer such men as these [Mormons] to vote, you will soon lose your suffrage."  Around 200 non-Mormons gathered in Gallatin on election day to prevent Mormons from voting.

When about thirty Latter Day Saints approached the polling place, a Missourian named Dick Weldon declared that in Clay County the Mormons had not been allowed to vote, "no more than negroes".  One of the Mormons present, Samuel Brown, claimed that Peniston's statements were false and then declared his intention to vote.  This triggered a brawl between the bystanders.

At the start of the brawl, Mormon John Butler let out a call, "Oh yes, you Danites, here is a job for us!" which rallied the Mormons and allowed them to drive off their opponents.

A number of Missourians left the scene to obtain guns and ammunition and swore that they would "kill all the Saints they could find, or drive them out of Daviess County, sparing neither men, women or children". The crowd dispersed, and the Mormons returned to their homes.

The skirmish is often cited as the first serious violence of the war in Missouri.

Rumors among both parties spread that there were casualties in the conflict. When Joseph Smith and volunteers rode to Adam-ondi-Ahman to assess the situation, they discovered there were no truths to the rumors.

When the Mormons heard a rumor that Judge Adam Black was gathering a mob near Millport, one hundred armed men, including Joseph Smith, surrounded Black's home.  They asked if the rumor was true and demanded that he sign a document disavowing any connection to the vigilance committees.  Black refused, but after meeting with Smith, he wrote and signed a document stating that he "is not attached to any mob, nor will attach himself to any such people, and so long as they [the Mormons] will not molest me, I will not molest them."  Black later confirmed that he had felt threatened by the large number of hostile armed men.

The Mormons also visited Sheriff William Morgan and several other leading Daviess County citizens, also forcing some of them to sign statements disavowing any ties to the vigilance committees.

At a meeting at Lyman Wight's home between leading Mormons and non-Mormons, both sides agreed not to protect anyone who had broken the law and to surrender all offenders to the authorities.  With peace restored, Smith's group returned to Caldwell County.

Black and others filed complaints against Smith and the other identifiable Mormon participants.  On September 7, Smith and Lyman Wight appeared before Judge Austin A. King to answer the charges.  King found that there was sufficient evidence to  have the defendants appear before a grand jury on misdemeanor charges.

Mormons expelled from De Witt

In the spring of 1838, Henry Root, a non-Mormon who was a major land-owner in Carroll County, visited Far West and sold his plots in the mostly vacant town of De Witt to church leaders.  De Witt possessed a strategically important location near the intersection of the Grand River and the Missouri River.  Two members of the Far West High Council, George M. Hinkle and John Murdock, were sent to take possession of the town and to begin to colonize it.

On July 30, citizens of Carroll County met in Carrollton to discuss the Mormon colonization of De Witt.  The question of whether or not Mormons should be allowed to settle in the county was placed on the August 6 ballot; a heavy majority favored expulsion of the Mormons.  A committee sent to De Witt ordered the Latter-day Saints to leave.  Hinkle and Murdock refused, citing their right as American citizens to settle where they pleased.

Sentiment among the anti-Mormon segment of Carroll County's population hardened, and some began to take up arms.  On August 19, 1838, Mormon settler Smith Humphrey reports that 100 armed men led by Colonel William Claude Jones took him prisoner for two hours and threatened him and the rest of the Mormon community.

Initial reaction by Missourians was mixed.  While Mormons were viewed as deluded or worse, many Missourians agreed with the sentiment expressed in the Southern Advocate:
By what color of propriety a portion of the people of the State, can organize themselves into a body, independent of the civil power, and contravene the general laws of the land by preventing the free enjoyment of the right of citizenship to another portion of the people, we are at a loss to comprehend.

As tensions built in Daviess County, other counties began to respond to Carroll County's request for assistance in expelling the Mormons from their county.  Citizens in Saline, Howard, Jackson, Chariton, Ray, and other nearby counties organized vigilance committees sympathetic to the Carroll County expulsion party.

Some isolated Mormons in outlying areas also came under attack. In Livingston County, a group of armed men forced Asahel Lathrop from his home, where they held his ill wife and children prisoner. After more than a week, a company of armed Mormons assisted Lathrop in rescuing his wife and two of his children (one had died while prisoner). Lathrop's wife and remaining children died shortly after their rescue.

On September 20, 1838, about one hundred fifty armed men rode into De Witt and demanded that the Mormons leave within ten days.  Hinkle and other Mormon leaders informed the men that they would fight.  They also sent a request for assistance to Governor Boggs, noting that the mob had threatened "to exterminate them, without regard to age or sex".

On October 1, the mob burned the home and stables of Smith Humphrey.  The citizens of De Witt sent non-Mormon Henry Root to appeal to Judge King and General Parks for assistance.  Later that day, the Carroll County forces sealed off the town.

The besieged town resorted to butchering whatever loose livestock wandered into town in order to avoid starvation while waiting for the militia or the Governor to come to their aid.  General Parks arrived with the Ray County militia on October 6, but his order to disperse was ignored by the mob.  When his own troops threatened to join the attackers, Parks was forced to withdraw to Daviess County in hopes that the Governor would come to mediate.  Parks wrote his superior, General David Rice Atchison, that "a word from his Excellency would have more power to quell this affair than a regiment."

On October 9, A C Caldwell returned to De Witt to report that the Governor's response was that the "quarrel was between the Mormons and the mob" and that they should fight it out.

On October 11, Mormon leaders agreed to abandon the settlement and move to Caldwell County.

On the first night of the march out of Carroll County, two Mormon women died.  One woman died of exposure, the other (a woman named Jenson) died in childbirth.  Several children also became ill during the ordeal and died later.

Daviess County expedition

General David R. Atchison wrote a letter to Governor Lilburn Boggs on October 16, 1838. He stated that General Parks reported to him that "a portion of the men from Carroll County, with one piece of artillery, are on their march for Daviess County, where it is thought the same lawless game is to be played over, and the Mormons to be driven from that county and probably from Caldwell County."  Atchison said further, "I would respectfully suggest to your Excellency the propriety of a visit to the scene of excitement in person, or at all events, a strong proclamation" as the only way to restore peace and the rule of law.  Boggs, however, ignored this plea and continued to wait as events unravelled.

Meanwhile, a group of non-Mormons from Clinton, Platte, and other counties began to harass Mormons in Daviess County, burning outlying homes and plundering property.  Latter Day Saint refugees began to flee to Adam-ondi-Ahman for protection and shelter against the upcoming winter.  Joseph Smith, returning to Far West from De Witt, was informed by General Doniphan of the deteriorating situation.  Doniphan already had troops raised to prevent fighting between Mormons and anti-Mormons in Daviess County.  On Sunday, October 14, a small company of state militia under the command of Colonel William A. Dunn of Clay County arrived in Far West.  Dunn, acting under the orders of Doniphan, continued on to Adam-ondi-Ahman.  Although he was sympathetic to the Mormons' plight, Doniphan reminded the Latter-day Saints that the Caldwell County militia could not legally enter Daviess County, and he advised Mormons traveling there to go in small parties and unarmed.  Ignoring this counsel, Judge Higby, a Mormon judge in Caldwell County called out the Caldwell militia, led by Colonel George M. Hinkle.  Although county officials could only legally act within the county, this judge authorized Hinkle to defend Latter-day Saint settlements in neighboring Daviess County.

Colonel Hinkle and Mormons of the Caldwell County militia were joined by elements of the Danite organization.   On October 18, these Mormons began to act as vigilantes and marched under arms in three groups to Daviess County.  Lyman Wight took his army and attacked Millport.  David W. Patten, also known as Captain Fearnot, attacked Gallatin.  Seymour Brunson attacked Grindstone Fork.  The Missourians and their families, outnumbered by the Mormons, made their way to neighboring counties.

Having taken control of the Missourian settlements, the Mormons plundered the property and burned the stores and houses.  The county seat, Gallatin, is reported to have been "completely gutted" – only one shoe store remained unscathed.  Millport, Grindstone Fork and the smaller Missourian settlement of Splawn's Ridge were also plundered and had some houses burned.  The plundered goods were deposited in the Bishop's storehouse at Diahman.

During the days that followed, Latter Day Saint vigilantes under the direction and encouragement of Lyman Wight drove Missourians who lived in outlying farms from their homes, which were similarly plundered and burned.  According to one witness, "We could stand in our door and see houses burning every night for over two weeks... the Mormons completely gutted Daviess County.  There was scarcely a Missourian's home left standing in the county.  Nearly every one was burned."

The Missourians evicted from their homes were no better prepared than the Mormon refugees had been.  After the stress of being expelled from Millport into the snow, Milford Donaho's wife gave birth prematurely, and the child was severely injured during the birth.

Even Missourians who had been friendly to the Mormons were not spared.  Jacob Stollings, a Gallatin merchant, was reported to have been generous in selling to Mormons on credit, but his store was plundered and burned with the rest.  Judge Josiah Morin and Samuel McBrier, both considered friendly to the Mormons, both fled Daviess County after being threatened.  McBrier's house was among those burned.

When a Mormon band plundered and burned the Taylor home, one young Mormon, Benjamin F Johnson, argued his fellow vigilantes into leaving a horse for a pregnant Mrs Taylor and her children to ride to safety.  Ironically, as a result of his kindness, he was the only Mormon who was positively identified to have participated in the home burnings.  After several non-Mormons made statements to the authorities that Johnson had acted as a moderating influence on the Danites, he was allowed to escape rather than stand trial.

Many Latter Day Saints were greatly troubled by the occurrences.  Mormon leader John Corrill wrote, "the love of pillage grew upon them very fast, for they plundered every kind of property they could get a hold of."  Some Latter-day Saints claimed that some of the Missourians burned their own homes in order to blame the Mormons.  None of these claims, however, purport to be eyewitness accounts.  Overwhelmingly, these claims are contradicted by the majority of both Missourian and Latter Day Saint testimony (which implicate the Mormons in the burnings) and also by the evidence of the looted property found in the possession of Latter Day Saints.  Even Mormon leader Parley P Pratt conceded that some burnings had been done by Mormons.  Based on the available evidence, LeSueur estimates that Mormons were responsible for the burning of fifty homes or shops and the displacement of one hundred non-Mormon families.  Millport, which at time was the largest city in the county and the center for trade, never recovered from the Mormon burnings, and became a ghost town.

Local citizens were outraged by the actions of the Danites and other Mormon bands.  Several Mormon homes near Millport were burned and their inhabitants expelled into the snow.  Agnes Smith, a sister-in-law of Joseph, was chased from her home with two small children when her home was burned.  With one child in each arm, she waded across an icy creek to safety in Adam-ondi-Ahman.  Nathan Tanner reported that his militia company rescued another woman and three small children who were hiding in the bushes as their home burned.  Other Mormons, fearing similar retribution by the Missourians, gathered into Adam-ondi-Ahman for protection.

Marsh affidavit

Thomas B. Marsh, President of the Quorum of the Twelve Apostles of the church, and fellow Apostle Orson Hyde were alarmed by the events of the Daviess County expedition.  On October 19, 1838, the day after Gallatin was burned, Thomas B. Marsh and fellow apostle Orson Hyde left the association of the Church. On October 24, they swore out affidavits concerning the burning and looting in Daviess County.  They also reported the existence of the Danite group among the Mormons and repeated a popular rumor that a group of Danites was planning to attack and burn Richmond and Liberty.

Battle of Crooked River

 
Fearing attack, many citizens of Ray County moved their wives and children across the Missouri River for safety. Instead of staying in the strip, Bogart passed into southern Caldwell County and began to disarm Mormons. Rumor reached Far West that a Militia unit from Ray County had taken Mormons prisoner and an armed party was quickly assembled to rescue these prisoners and push the Militia out of the county.

When the Mormons arrived on the scene, the State Militia unit was camped along Crooked River in the Bunkham's Strip just south of Caldwell County.  The Mormons divided into three columns led by David W. Patten, Charles C. Rich, and James Durphee.  The Missouri Militia had the advantage of position and fired, but the Mormons continued to advance.  The Militia broke ranks and fled across the river.  Although Mormons won the battle, they took heavier casualties than the Militia, only one of whom, Moses Rowland, was killed.  On the Mormon side, Gideon Carter was killed in the battle and nine other Mormons were wounded, including Patten, who soon after died from his wounds.   According to one Mormon witness, the deaths "threw a gloom over the whole place".

Mormon Extermination Order

News of the battle quickly spread and contributed to an all-out panic in northwestern Missouri.  Exaggerated initial reports indicated that nearly all of Bogart's company had been killed.   Generals Atchison, Doniphon and Parks decided they needed to call out the Militia to "prevent further violence".  This is how it was explained in a letter to US Army Colonel R. B. Mason of Ft. Leavenworth:
The citizens of Daviess, Carroll, and some other counties have raised mob after mob for the last two months for the purpose of driving a group of mormons from those counties and from the State.

While the State Militia gathered, Missouri unorganized Militia continued to act on their own, driving Mormons inward to Far West and Adam-ondi-Ahman.

Meanwhile, exaggerated reports from the Battle of Crooked River made their way to Missouri's governor, Lilburn Boggs. Boggs held strong preconceptions against the Mormons, dating from the time when both he and they had lived in Jackson County.  Although he had refrained from stopping the illegal anti-Mormon siege of De Witt, he now mustered 2,500 State Militia to put down the Mormon insurrection against the state.  Possibly playing on Rigdon's July 4 sermon that talked of a "war of extermination", Boggs issued Missouri Executive Order 44, also known as the "Extermination Order", on October 27, which stated that "the Mormons must be treated as enemies, and must be exterminated or driven from the State if necessary for the public peace..."  The Extermination Order was finally rescinded on June 25, 1976, by Governor Christopher Samuel "Kit" Bond.

Haun's Mill Massacre

Agitation against the Latter Day Saints had become particularly fierce in the sparsely settled counties north and east of Caldwell County.  Mormon dissenters from Daviess County who had fled to Livingston County reportedly told Livingston County militia under Colonel Thomas Jennings that Mormons were gathering at Haun's Mill to mount a raid into Livingston County.  One 19th century Missouri historian noted:

The Daviess County men were very bitter against the Mormons, and vowed the direst vengeance on the entire sect.  It did not matter whether or not the Mormons at [Haun's] mill had taken any part in the disturbance which had occurred [in Daviess County]; it was enough that they were Mormons.  The Livingston men became thoroughly imbued with the same spirit, and were eager for the raid ... feel[ing] an extraordinary sympathy for the outrages suffered by their neighbors

Although it had just been issued, it is unlikely that the governor's "Extermination Order" would have already reached these men, and in any event it would not have authorized them to cross into Caldwell County to raid. In addition, none of the participants in the raid cited the order as justification for their actions.

On October 29, this large vigilante band of some 250 men assembled and entered eastern Caldwell County.  When the Missourian raiders approached the settlement on the afternoon of October 30, some 30 to 40 Latter Day Saint families were living or encamped there.  Despite an attempt by the Mormons to parley, the mob attacked.  Thomas McBride surrendered his rifle to Jacob Rogers, who shot McBride with his own gun.  When McBride held out a hand, Rogers cut it off with a corn knife, then may have further mangled his body while McBride was still alive.  Other members of the mob opened fire, which sent the Latter-day Saints fleeing in all directions.

While Mormon women and children scattered and hid in the surrounding woods and nearby homes, Mormon men and boys rallied to defend the settlement.  They moved into a blacksmith shop, which they hoped to use as a makeshift defensive fortification.  Unfortunately, the shop had large gaps between the logs which the Missourians shot into and, as one Mormon later recalled, it became more "slaughter-house rather than a shelter". The mob gave no quarter.  After most of the defenders in the blacksmith shop had been killed or mortally wounded, some of the Missourians entered to finish the work.  Finding 10-year-old Sardius Smith hiding behind the bellows, William Reynolds of Livingston County shot and killed the boy, saying: "Nits will make lice, and if he had lived he would have become a Mormon"

In all, 17 Latter Day Saints were killed in what came to be called the Haun's Mill Massacre.  When survivors of the massacre reached Far West, the reports of the savagery of the attack played a significant part in the decision of the Mormons to surrender.

None of the Missourians were ever prosecuted for their role in the Haun's Mill Massacre.

Siege of Far West and capture of church leaders

Most Mormons gathered to Far West and Adam-ondi-Ahman for protection.  Major General Samuel D. Lucas marched the state militia to Far West and laid siege to the Mormon headquarters.

Surrounded by the state militia, the mood in besieged Far West was uneasy. Joseph Smith ordered Colonel George M. Hinkle, the head of the Mormon militia in Caldwell County, to ride out and meet with General Lucas to seek terms.  According to Hinkle, Smith wanted a treaty with the Missourians "on any terms short of battle". Other Latter Day Saint witnesses remembered that Smith said to "beg like a dog for peace".

Lucas' terms were severe.  The Latter-day Saints were to give up their leaders for trial and to surrender all of their arms.  Every Mormon who had taken up arms was to sell his property to pay for the damages to Missourian property and for the muster of the state militia.  Finally, the Mormons who had taken up arms were to leave the state.  Colonel Hinkle stated that the Latter Day Saints would help bring to justice those Mormons who had violated the law, but he protested that the other terms were illegal and unconstitutional.

Colonel Hinkle rode to the church leaders in Far West and informed them of the offered terms.  According to Latter Day Saint witness Reed Peck, when Smith was told that the Mormons would be expected to leave the state, he replied that "he did not care" and that he would be glad to get out of the "damnable state" anyway. Smith and the other leaders rode with Hinkle back to the Missouri militia encampment.  The militia promptly arrested Smith and the other leaders.  Smith believed that Hinkle had betrayed him, but Hinkle maintained his innocence and claimed that he was following Smith's orders.  To William Wines Phelps, a fellow Latter-day Saint and witness to the events, Hinkle wrote: "When the facts were laid before Joseph, did he not say, 'I will go'; and did not the others go with him, and that, too, voluntarily, so far as you and I were concerned?"

Joseph Smith and the other arrested leaders were held overnight under guard in General Lucas' camp, where they were left exposed to the elements.

Hyrum Smith, Brigham Young, and other leaders left at Far West warned the veterans of Crooked River to flee.  "If found, they will be shot down like dogs," warned Hyrum.

Joseph Smith Jr attempted to negotiate with Lucas, but it became clear that Lucas considered his conditions to be non-negotiable.  At 8:00 am, Joseph sent word to Far West to surrender.

Ebenezer Robinson described the scene at Far West,
General Clark made the following speech to the brethren on the public square: "... The orders of the governor to me were, that you should be exterminated, and not allowed to remain in the state, and had your leaders not been given up, and the terms of the treaty complied with, before this, you and your families would have been destroyed and your houses in ashes."

The Far West militia was marched out of the city and forced to turn over their weapons to General Lucas. The men under the command of Lucas were then allowed to ransack the city to search for weapons. Brigham Young recounts that, once the militia was disarmed, Lucas's men were turned loose on the city:
[T]hey commenced their ravages by plundering the citizens of their bedding, clothing, money, wearing apparel, and every thing of value they could lay their hands upon, and also attempting to violate the chastity of the women in sight of their husbands and friends, under the pretence of hunting for prisoners and arms. The soldiers shot down our oxen, cows, hogs and fowls, at our own doors, taking part away and leaving the rest to rot in the streets. The soldiers also turned their horses into our fields of corn.

Trials of Mormon leaders

Lucas tried Joseph Smith and other Mormon leaders by court martial on November 1, the evening of the surrender.  After the court martial, he ordered General Alexander William Doniphan:
You will take Joseph Smith and the other prisoners into the public square of Far West and shoot them at 9 o'clock tomorrow morning.

Doniphan refused to obey the order, replying:
It is cold-blooded murder.  I will not obey your order.  My brigade shall march for Liberty to-morrow morning, at 8 o'clock, and if you execute those men, I will hold you responsible before an earthly tribunal, so help me God!

The defendants, consisting of about 60 men including Joseph Smith and Sidney Rigdon, were turned over to a civil court of inquiry in Richmond under Judge Austin A. King, on charges of treason, murder, arson, burglary, robbery, larceny and perjury. The court of inquiry began November 12, 1838. After the inquiry, all but a few of the Mormon prisoners were released, but Joseph Smith, Sidney Rigdon, Lyman Wight, Caleb Baldwin, Hyrum Smith and Alexander McRae were held in the Liberty Jail in Liberty, Clay County on charges of treason against the state, murder, arson, burglary, robbery and larceny.

During a transfer to another prison in the spring of 1839, Smith escaped. The exact circumstances that allowed for him to escape are not certain.  John Whitmer recounts that Smith bribed the guards.

It is also believed that Smith's imprisonment had become an embarrassment, and that an escape would be convenient for Boggs and the rest of the Missouri political establishment.

Smith and the other Mormons resettled in Nauvoo, Illinois, beginning in 1839.

Daviess County residents were outraged by the escape of Smith and the other leaders.  William Bowman, one of the guards, was dragged by his hair across the town square.  Sheriff Morgan was ridden through town on an iron bar, and died shortly afterward from the injuries he suffered during the ride.

Aftermath

General Clark viewed Executive Order 44 as having been fulfilled by the agreement of the Mormons to evacuate the state the following spring.  The militia was disbanded in late November.

Missouri blamed the Mormons for the conflict and forced the Latter-day Saints to sign over all their lands in order to pay for the state militia muster.

Mormon leaders appealed to the state legislature to overturn the requirement that they leave the state, but the legislature tabled the issue until a date well after that when the Mormons would have left the state.

With the refusal of the Governor or Legislature to intervene, and having surrendered the bulk of their firearms, Mormons were left nearly defenseless to face the mob.  Mormon residents were harassed and attacked by angry residents who were no longer restrained by militia officers.  Judge Austin A King, who had been assigned the cases of the Mormons charged with offenses during the conflict, warned "If you once think to plant crops or to occupy your lands any longer than the first of April, the citizens will be upon you: they will kill you every one, men, women and children."

Flight of Mormons to Illinois

Stripped of their property, the Mormons were then given a few months to leave the state.  Most refugees made their way east to Illinois, where residents of the town of Quincy helped them.  When faced with the Mormon refugees from Missouri, the people of Quincy, Illinois, were outraged by the treatment the Mormons had experienced.  One resolution passed by the Quincy town council read:
Resolved: That the gov of Missouri, in refusing protection to this class of people when pressed upon by an heartless mob, and turning upon them a band of unprincipled Militia, with orders encouraging their extermination, has brought a lasting disgrace upon the state over which he presides. 

Eventually, the large portion of the Mormons regrouped and founded a new city in Illinois which they called Nauvoo.

Political fallout

When events in Daviess County caused Missourians to see the Mormon community as a violent threat, non-Mormon public opinion hardened in favor of a firm military response.  Even militia commanders such as Clark, Doniphan, and Atchison who were sympathetic to the Mormons came to see a military response as the only way to bring the situation under control.

Many of Boggs's constituents felt that he had mis-managed the situation, by failing to intervene earlier in the crisis, and then by overreacting on the basis of partial and incorrect information.

The Missouri Argus published an editorial on December 20, 1838, that public opinion should not permit the Mormons to forcibly be expelled from the state:
They cannot be driven beyond the limits of the state—that is certain. To do so, would be to act with extreme cruelty. Public opinion has recoiled from a summary and forcible removal of our negro population;—much more likely will it be to revolt at the violent expulsion of two or three thousand souls, who have so many ties to connect them with us in a common brotherhood. If they choose to remain, we must be content. The day has gone by when masses of men can be outlawed, and driven from society to the wilderness, unprotected. ... The refinement, the charity of our age, will not brook it.

Even people who otherwise would have had no sympathy for the Mormons were appalled by Boggs's Executive Order and the treatment of the Mormons by the mobs.  One contemporary critic of the Mormons wrote:
Mormonism is a monstrous evil; and the only place where it ever did or ever could shine, this side of the world of despair, is by the side of the Missouri mob.

LeSueur notes that, along with other setbacks, Boggs's mishandling of the Mormon conflict left him "politically impotent" by the end of his term.

Boggs assassination attempt

 
On May 6, 1842, Boggs was shot in the head at his home three blocks from Temple Lot. Boggs survived, but Mormons came under immediate suspicion especially of the alleged failed assassination attempt by Orrin Porter Rockwell of the Mormon Danites.

Sheriff J.H. Reynolds discovered a revolver at the scene, still loaded with buckshot. He surmised that the perpetrator had fired upon Boggs and lost his firearm in the night when the weapon recoiled due to its unusually large shot. The gun was found to have been stolen from a local shopkeeper, who identified "that hired man of Ward's" as the most likely culprit. Reynolds determined the man in question was Porter Rockwell, a close associate of Joseph Smith.  However, Reynolds was unable to capture Rockwell.

John C. Bennett, a disaffected Mormon, reported that Smith had offered a cash reward to anyone who would assassinate Boggs, and that Smith had admitted to him that Rockwell had done the deed.

Joseph Smith vehemently denied Bennett's account, speculating that Boggs—no longer governor, but campaigning for state senate—was attacked by an election opponent. One historian notes that Governor Boggs was running for election against several violent men, all capable of the deed, and that there was no particular reason to suspect Rockwell of the crime.  Other historians are convinced that Rockwell was involved in the shooting.

Whatever the case, the following year Rockwell was arrested, tried, and acquitted of the attempted murder, although most of Boggs' contemporaries remained convinced of his guilt. A grand jury was unable to find sufficient evidence to indict him, convinced in part by his reputation as a deadly gunman and his statement that he "never shot at anybody, if I shoot they get shot!... He's still alive, ain't he?"

See also

 Border Ruffian
 Illinois Mormon War (1844–1845)
 Latter Day Saint martyrs
 List of conflicts in the United States
 Missouri Executive Order 44 (1838 Missouri)
 Mormon Exodus (1846–1857)
 Utah War (1857–1858)

Notes

References

.
.

.
.
 
.
.
.
. Reprinted by Dale R. Broadhurst at sidneyrigdon.com.
 
.

.
 
.
 Jenkins, James H., Casus Belli: Ten Factors That Contributed to the Outbreak of the 1838 'Mormon War' in Missouri, Independence, Missouri: CreateSpace, 2014.

 
 
 .
 
.
 
.

.
.
.
.
 
The True Latter Day Saints' Herald, Plano, Illinois.
.

External links

 Far West Cultural Center primary sources 
 Mel Tungate's Battle of Crooked River sources website
 Joseph Smith's Journal Entries
 History of the Reorganized Church of Jesus Christ of Latter Day Saints, Volume 2 Chapter 11

 
History of Missouri
Internal wars of the United States
Mormonism and violence
Mormonism-related controversies
Mormon
Mormon
Crimes in Missouri
Mormon War